The Aber Swing Bridge, also known as the Pont yr Aber and Caernarfon swing bridge, is a pedestrian swing bridge in Gwynedd, Wales. This footbridge crosses over the Afon Seiont from the foreshore to the Watergate entrance in the centre of Caernarfon near Caernarfon Castle. It was built in 1970, is made of concrete and steel, and is powered with electricity.

This bridge replaces another swing bridge which opened on March 1, 1900 (St. David's Day). That first bridge was built to replace the ferry. It was demolished in 1969. For a short time after that, there was a bailey bridge.

References

External links 
 

Swing bridges in Wales
Pedestrian bridges in Wales
Caernarfon
Bridges in Gwynedd